Gülnur Yerlisu (born 1983) is a European champion Turkish female Taekwondo practitioner.

She was born 1969 in Cologne to a Turkish family in Germany.

Gülnur Yerlisu won the silver medal at the 1991 World Taekwondo Championships held in Athens, Greece. In 1992, she became European champion at the 1992 Championships in Valencia, Spain. AT the 1993 World Taekwondo Championships held in New York City, United States, she became bronze medalist.

Her two siblings, sister Tennur and brother. Taner Bekir, are both formerly successful national taekwondo practitioners at World and European level. They run a family-owned company for martial arts equipment. She is now a teacher.

Achievements

  1990 International German Championships - Nürnberg, Germany -47 kg (Youth A)
  1991 International German Championships - Idar-Oberstein, Germany -47 kg
  1991 World Championships - Athens, Greece	-43 kg
  1992 European Championships - Valencia, Spain -43 kg
  1993 World Championships - New York City, United States -47 kg

References

1969 births
Sportspeople from Cologne
Living people
Turkish female taekwondo practitioners
Turkish female martial artists
World Taekwondo Championships medalists
European Taekwondo Championships medalists
20th-century Turkish sportswomen
21st-century Turkish sportswomen